P. Soundrapandian was an Indian politician and former Member of the Legislative Assembly of Tamil Nadu. He was elected to the Tamil Nadu legislative assembly as a Dravida Munnetra Kazhagam candidate from Krishnarayapuram constituency in 1967 and 1971 elections, and as an Anna Dravida Munnetra Kazhagam candidate in 1977 election.

References 

Dravida Munnetra Kazhagam politicians
Year of birth missing (living people)
Living people
Tamil Nadu MLAs 1967–1972
Tamil Nadu MLAs 1971–1976
Tamil Nadu MLAs 1977–1980